Anna Teresa Margareta "Greta" Johansson (9 January 1895 – 28 January 1978) was a Swedish diver and swimmer, who competed at the 1912 Summer Olympics. She won the gold medal in the 10 m platform and finished fourth with the Swedish 4 × 100 m freestyle relay team.

Johansson learned to swim and dive in Stockholm's municipal baths. She attended them on free tickets given at her public school, as all Swedish children were then required to learn swimming and diving. She won the Swedish titles in 1910, in the breaststroke, and in 1911, in the 100 m freestyle and high diving. In 1913 she emigrated to the United States, where she first worked as a shop assistant. There she married the Swedish diver Ernst Brandsten who also competed at the 1912 Olympics. The couple trained divers at the Stanford University from 1915 to 1948 and operated the sports recreation Searsville Lake Park. They were both inducted into the International Swimming Hall of Fame: Brandsten as a diving coach in 1966 and Johansson as a diver in 1973.

See also
 List of members of the International Swimming Hall of Fame

References

Further reading 
 

1895 births
1978 deaths
Swedish female divers
Swedish female freestyle swimmers
Swedish female breaststroke swimmers
Olympic divers of Sweden
Olympic swimmers of Sweden
Divers at the 1912 Summer Olympics
Swimmers at the 1912 Summer Olympics
Olympic gold medalists for Sweden
Swimmers from Stockholm
Olympic medalists in diving
Stockholms KK swimmers
Medalists at the 1912 Summer Olympics
Stockholms KK divers